Jacatra is a genus of cicadas in the family Cicadidae. There is at least one described species in Jacatra, J. typica.

References

Further reading

 
 
 
 

Prasiini
Cicadidae genera